Ádám Varga may refer to:

Ádám Varga (wrestler) (born 1989), Hungarian wrestler, participated in Wrestling at the 2015 European Games – Men's Greco-Roman 98 kg
Ádám Varga (actor) (born 1989), Hungarian actor starring in Land of Storms in 2014
Ádám Varga (footballer) (born 1999), Hungarian football player
Ádám Varga (canoeist) (born 1999), Hungarian canoeist